Venom and Eternity is a 1951 French avant-garde film by Isidore Isou that grew out of the Lettrist movement in Paris. It created a scandal at the 1951 Cannes Film Festival.

Description
Venom and Eternity is arranged in a three-part structure. The first chapter, "Principle", displays people walking around the streets of Paris as the audio track presents an argument at a film society. The second chapter, "Development", shows a romantic meeting between two people. This section is combined with found footage. The final chapter, "Proof", uses increasingly abstract images, including countdown leader and clear leader. Its audio track resumes the debate from "Principle" and features Lettrist poetry.

Production
Isou began filming Venom and Eternity in 1950. The scenes of various Lettrists walking were shot on the streets of Saint-Germain-des-Prés. Isou used found footage discarded by the Ministry of Defence and various film laboratories.

Release
Isou first screened a four-and-a-half-hour rough cut of the film on 20 April 1951. Fearing that he would be deported from France in the event of public controversy, Isou had the film transported to the 1951 Cannes Film Festival by Marc'O, François Dufrene, Maurice Lemaître, and Gil J. Wolman. Isou was unable to enter Venom and Eternity into the festival but harassed officials until they allowed him to present his film at the Vox Theater.

At the time of the premiere, only the first third of the film had a completed image track. A hostile audience began jeering shortly after the film began. After the first section finished, the screen went blank. The projector light was turned off as the audio track continued to play to a darkened theatre. Audience members were infuriated, and the screening was ended early. Accounts of the scandalous response described a rioting audience and police officers using fire hoses on the crowd, but these stories are largely apocryphal. Director Jean Cocteau awarded Isou the "Prix de spectateurs d'avant-garde" for Venom and Eternity.

As soon as Venom and Eternity was completed, the Ciné-Club Avant-Garde 52 showed it at the Musée de l'Homme in Paris. Starting in January 1952, it had a two-week theatrical run at the Studio de l'Etoile.

Legacy
Venom and Eternity was the first cinematic work by the Lettrist movement. The film became a major influence on the work of Stan Brakhage.

See also
 List of avant-garde films of the 1950s

Notes

References

External links
 

1950s avant-garde and experimental films
1951 directorial debut films
1951 films
French avant-garde and experimental films
French black-and-white films
Lettrism
1950s French-language films
1950s French films